Venset is a village in the municipality of Fauske in Nordland county, Norway.

Transportation
Norwegian County Road 530 passes through the village. The route was formerly part of Norwegian National Road 80 which runs from the town of Fauske to the town of Bodø until 2011 when the Røvik Tunnel came into service.

History
In 1858, the farmer Mons Petter brought the ore that he had found near the village of Sulitjelma to Venset, where it was examined by the merchant Bernhard Koch. This led to the establishment of Sulitjelma Mines, which began operations in 1891.

References

Fauske
Villages in Nordland